The Church of St John the Divine, is in Frankby Road, Frankby, Wirral, Merseyside, England.  It is an active Anglican parish church in the deanery of Wirral, North, the archdeaconry of Chester and the diocese of Chester.  Its benefice is united with that of St Nicholas, Greasby.  The church is recorded in the National Heritage List for England as a designated Grade II listed building.

History

The church was built in 1861–62, and was designed by W. and J. Hay.

Architecture

Exterior
St John's is built in stone and has slate roofs with bands of different colours.  It consists of a three-bay nave with a south porch, a north aisle, a chancel, and a north vestry.  There is a bellcote on the east gable of the nave.  Along the walls of the nave are buttresses and two-light windows containing Geometric tracery, and along the wall of the aisle are paired windows.  The east window has three lights.

Interior
Inside the church the arcade is carried on round columns.  The chancel arch has corbels, one of which is carved with a sower.  There are four chandeliers.  The font is round with interlaced blind tracery.  On the wall is a dole cupboard.  The pulpit has canted ends and it contains a canopied niche.  The organ case and pipes are painted, as is the panelled chancel ceiling.  On the east wall of the chancel is panelling, and to the south is a double sedilia.  In the north aisle are three windows with stained glass of 1873 depicting Old Testament figures.  These were made by Morris & Co., and were designed by Edward Burne-Jones.  There are two windows by C. E. Kempe dated 1870 and 1871, and the rest are by Clayton and Bell.  The two-manual pipe organ was made by H. Wedlake of London.

See also

Listed buildings in Hoylake

References

Grade II listed churches in Merseyside
Church of England church buildings in Merseyside
Churches completed in 1862
Gothic Revival church buildings in England
Gothic Revival architecture in Merseyside
Churches in the Metropolitan Borough of Wirral
Diocese of Chester
1862 establishments in England